Marvella Belle Hern Bayh (February 14, 1933 – April 24, 1979) was the wife of Indiana Senator Birch Bayh, the mother of former Indiana Senator Birch Evans Bayh III (Evan), and a national spokeswoman for the American Cancer Society.

Life
Bayh was born in the Garfield County, Oklahoma, town of Lahoma, and was the daughter of Bernett E. (née Monson) and Delbert Murphy Hern. Her ancestry included Norwegian, German, and English. (Other sources say that she was born in Enid, Oklahoma.) She grew up on a farm in Oklahoma, was elected to the top position in Oklahoma Girls State and president of Girls Nation, and attended Oklahoma State University. In 1951, she defeated her future husband in a national "outstanding young orator" competition sponsored by the National Farm Bureau. She completed her degree in education at Indiana University in 1960.

She married Birch Bayh in August 1952 and moved to Indiana. When he decided to run first for the Indiana House of Representatives in 1954 and then for the US Senate in 1962 she began her career as a political wife. Former senator Bill Bradley described her as "a valuable and active half of the Bayh political team."Bayh suffered from a variety of health problems as the result of a car accident shortly after her marriage. Despite recurring back problems and double vision, Bayh remained deeply involved in the Washington political and social scene. She and her husband also survived a plane crash in 1964 that killed two people and critically injured Senator Ted Kennedy.

The Bayhs were close friends with Senator Kennedy and his wife Joan Kennedy, as well as President John F. Kennedy and Jacqueline Kennedy. As an Oklahoman, Bayh also formed warm and close relationships with President Lyndon B. Johnson and Lady Bird Johnson.

Bayh had a keen interest in current events and public affairs and was a skilled campaigner and public speaker. In 1967, President Johnson recognized her abilities and asked her to become the vice-chairman of the Democratic National Committee—a job she turned down with great reluctance at the request of her husband's staff when he was launching his own Senate re-election campaign. Bayh later described his failure to intervene and support her wish to take the job as "totally selfish and insensitive" and said, "That was the worst mistake I ever made."

Personal tragedy also marred her family life. Her mother died early from heart failure, and her father became a violent alcoholic later in life, eventually murdering his second wife and then taking his own life.

In 1971, Bayh was diagnosed with breast cancer. She underwent a mastectomy followed by radiation and 18 months of chemotherapy treatments. In order to support his wife, Birch Bayh announced that he would not be a candidate for president in 1972.

After her recovery, Bayh ("the first public figure to experience and share her breast cancer publicly") became a spokesperson for the American Cancer Society. She wrote extensively about her experiences with cancer in her autobiography, Marvella: A Personal Journey. In 1974, she became  a Bicentennial reporter for NBC's Sunday television program, a role she filled through July 4, 1976.

In 1978, more than six years after her cancer operation and treatment, the cancer recurred. Despite aggressive treatment, she died on April 24, 1979, at the age of forty-six, at the National Institutes of Health in Bethesda, Maryland.

Recognition 
Bayh's efforts in fighting cancer and spreading information about it led to her receiving the James Ewing Award from the American Society of Surgical Oncologists and the Hubert H. Humphrey Inspirational Award from the American Cancer Society's District of Columbia chapter.

References

1933 births
1979 deaths
American people of German descent
American people of Norwegian descent
American people of English descent
Deaths from cancer in Maryland
Spouses of Indiana politicians
20th-century American politicians
Bayh family
People from Lahoma, Oklahoma
American women journalists
20th-century American women